Dornstetten is a town in the district of Freudenstadt in Baden-Württemberg in southern Germany. It is situated in the Black Forest, 7 km east of Freudenstadt. It was founded in the early Middle Ages and is well known for its half-timbered houses (German: Fachwerkhäuser).

Geography 
Dornstetten is located in the northern Black Forest. The Glatt arises in the outlying village of Aach, at the confluence of the streams Ettenbach, Stockerbach, and Kübelbach.

Constituent communities 
The current municipality of Dornstetten was created in 1975 as part of a major reorganization of communities in Baden-Württemberg. It consists of the original town of Dornstetten (which included Dornstetten and the farmstead Lattenberg), the former municipality of Aach (included the village of Aach and the farmstead Benzinger Hof), and the former municipality of Hallwangen (simply the village of Hallwangen).
The area around Dornstetten also included the former settlements of Brennenweiler, Bühlerhof, and Diffenthal or Niedertall, which no longer exist.

History 
Dornstetten is first documented in the year 767 in the Lorsch Codex, as part of the Waldgeding of the Upper Glatt Valley, a loose confederation of settlements roughly corresponding to the modern municipal area. The town received city rights sometime between 1267 and 1276. At that time, Dornstetten belonged to the Counts of Urach-Fürstenberg. After passing through the hands of the Counts of Hohenberg, it was acquired by Württemberg in 1320. A school is first mentioned in the town in 1461. In 1755, Dornstetten was made seat of the Oberamt of Dornstetten, an administrative district that was nevertheless dissolved in 1807 and incorporated in the Oberamt of Freudenstadt.

On January 1, 1975, Dornstetten was merged with Aach and Hallwangen to make up the municipality of Dornstetten, as part of Baden-Württemberg's major communal reforms in the early 1970s.

Religions 
Since the time of the Reformation, Dornstetten has been heavily Protestant. A Roman Catholic church is in the town, but Catholics in Dornstetten technically belong to the parochial community of Freudenstadt. A New Apostolic church, as well as a Methodist community, can also be found in Dornstetten.

Coat of arms 
The arms of Dornstetten consist of a black five-pointed antler (representing Württemberg) above a black thornbush (canting arms based on the town's name, as Dorn means "thorn" in German)

Sister cities 
Dornstetten enjoys a partnership with Scey-sur-Saône-et-Saint-Albin in the department of Haute Saône in France, where students from Dornstetten Gymnasium participate yearly in a student exchange program.

Economy and infrastructure

Transportation 
The city maintains a bus line and belongs to the Transport Association of the District of Freudenstadt, the VGF (Verkehrs-Gemeinschaft Landkreis Freudenstadt). Dornstetten also has a stop along the Eutingen-Freudenstadt railroad line (the Gäubahn). Every two hours, one can catch a direct train to Karlsruhe or Stuttgart.

Education 
Dornstetten has a Gymnasium, a Realschule, and a Hauptschule in one building, three elementary schools (one each in Dornstetten, Aach, and Hallwangen), and seven Kindergartens. The Neckar-Alb Region School for the Physically Disabled operates a branch in Dornstetten, and the area has  a special school for the mentally disabled, the Wilhelm-Hofman Schule.

Culture and attractions

Museums 
Like most towns in the area, Dornstetten has a Heimatmuseum which documents the history of the local area. The Doll and Toy Museum is housed in the Hegel Department Store building (Kaufhaus Hegel).

Himmlisch Heer is a historic copper, silver and barite mine open to the public in Hallwangen.

Buildings 
The historic Altstadt with its half-timbered Fachwerkhäuser, is well known throughout the area, and a popular destination for day-trippers. Dornstetten lies along the southern part of the German Half-Timbered House Road (Deutsche Fachwerkstraße), which runs from Mosbach to Haslach im Kinzigtal and includes several historic attractions.

Barefoot park 

The Barefoot Park Dornstetten in Hallwangen offers a 2.4 km (1.5-mi) path and several stations along the way to learn about nature, play, or experience walking barefoot for its medicinal value.

Famous residents 
 Jacob Beurlin (ca. 1520; † October 28, 1561 in Paris), Protestant theologian and Reformer
 Wolfram Graf (*1965), composer, pianist, and organist

External links 

 Official website of the municipality

References

Freudenstadt (district)
Württemberg